The urban renewal of Sydney is an ongoing land redevelopment process that is creating and reviving new urban centres across Sydney, Australia. Urban renewal refers to the refurbishment of derelict buildings, streets or neighbourhoods and is accompanied with the process of gentrification attributed by changes in land use and deindustrialisation of areas. In 2020, there are several projects underway and planned including Barangaroo, The Bays Precinct and Green Square.

Background 

Since the early 1900s, Sydney has experienced rounds of urban renewal that continued to the 21st century with new plans and projects that contribute to the city's changing urban landscape. Sydney's urban redevelopment reflects the cycles of economic growth, with rapid housing development in periods of expansion, followed by the rise of poverty and misery in times of economic downturn. With the gold rush in the 1850s which later coincided with the 1860s depression, the inner-city slums of Glebe, The Rocks, Paddington, Surry Hills and Ultimo were born.

Suburban living was reserved for the affluent and wealthy, which accounted for 4.29 percent of the colony (a population of 5,543 people) in 1843. As the number of middle-class and bourgeois increased, so did the number of people living in Sydney suburbia where suburbanites made up 24.5 percent of the colony (a population of 275,631) in 1891. The Victorian-era terrace houses that feature in some of Sydney's inner-city areas, were constructed as part of the building boom in the 1880s and featured 4-5 rooms with primitive features that were ahead of their time. At the end of the 19th century, inner-city living was no longer desirable as the suburbs became more accessible with the development and expansion of the Sydney railway network, leaving the terraces to despair. With the 1900 outbreak of the bubonic plague in Darling Harbour, the waterfront working-class slums that surrounded (including Millers Point and The Rocks) were razed and slated for renewal, due to the century-old unregulated building practices in place and poor sanitation. These areas were later redeveloped into warehouses and port facilities; marking the first of three rounds (later in the 1920s and 1960-70s) of redevelopment and slum clearing in Sydney.

Following the Second World War, there was an influx of immigrants that tripled Sydney's population and brought rise to the "Australian dream" of living in a suburban home on a quarter acre block. As Sydney's population grew, the city continued to sprawl to the west and south-west, where new "garden suburbs" were developed 50km from the city centre. In the 1970s, workplaces and inner-city factories started to move to the suburbs and commuting to the city started to lose its appeal. The inner-city slums were steadily redeveloped as professionals moved in, creating mixed communities that included the older working class, remnants of the underclass and light industry and service vendors. In the 21st century, living in these inner-city areas had become highly sought after and waves of gentrification have elevated house prices and transformed these former slums to cosmopolitan and trendy mixed precincts.

Regulatory background 
Since the 1940s, urban renewal across Australian cities had been identified as key to its functioning in both state and federal government policies. In the late 1960s, there were calls for federal action over public agitation against the attitudes of neglect from state governments and the state of Australian inner cities. With the election of the Whitlam Government in 1972, the Department of Urban and Regional Development was established and tasked to develop an inner urban policy and assist urban regeneration projects. This led to the rehabilitation projects for Glebe, Waterloo and Wooloomooloo.

The Department was abolished and incorporated into the Department of Environment, Housing and Community Development, where funding on urban and regional development halved, tighter  budget reforms were enforced, and provisions for community and private sector involvement were made. Since the 1980s, government intervention in urban development shifted, leading to the progression of the neoliberisation of governance, enabling the private sector a greater role in delivering urban ambitions. Such restructuring led to the redevelopment of the inner-city areas of Pyrmont and Ultimo as part of the Australian Government's Building Better Cities Program. Fundamental to the success of the Program was private investment, which enabled redevelopment projects such as Pyrmont-Ultimo take shape.

In 2018, the NSW Government announced the latest vision for Sydney, A Metropolis of Three Cities, which sets out the plan for three cities across Greater Sydney.

Greater Sydney Region Plan - A Metropolis of Three Cities 

Developed by the Greater Sydney Commission and published in March 2018, The Greater Sydney Region Plan - A Metropolis of Three Cities lays out the vision for an integrated approach to land use and transport planning and aims to boost the liveability, productivity and sustainability for a growing Sydney population.

The plan identifies three major cities:

 Eastern Harbour City - around Central Sydney
 Central River City - around Parramatta 
 Western Sydney Parkland City - between Penrith and Liverpool

and alternatively divides the metropolis into five, more precisely defined districts, with a "district plan" formulated for each district:

 Central City District: including the northwestern local government areas of Blacktown, Cumberland, Parramatta and the Hills Shire.
 Eastern City District: including the eastern, central and inner western local government areas of Bayside, Burwood, Canada Bay, City of Sydney, Inner West, Randwick, Strathfield, Waverley and Woollahra.
 North District: including the northeastern local government areas of Hornsby, Hunter's Hill, Ku-ring-gai, Lane Cove, Mosman, North Sydney, Northern Beaches, Ryde and Willoughby
 South District: including the southern local government areas of Canterbury-Bankstown, Georges River and Sutherland
 Western City District: including the western local government areas of Blue Mountains, Camden, Campbelltown, Fairfield, Hawkesbury, Liverpool, Penrith and Wollondilly.

Local government authorities are required to align their planning instruments to the priorities listed in the Metropolis of Three Cities (Regional Plan) and the relevant District Plan.

Urban renewal corridors across Greater Sydney have been identified in the plan (see below). According to population forecasts, it is anticipated that revitalisation in these areas will enable capacity for new housing, aligned with sufficient infrastructure to help supply an additional 725,000 homes needed to meet demand.

Implications

Displacement of residents 

With the renewal and subsequent gentrification of inner-city Sydney, the displacement of residents was a common occurrence. These areas were often home to a marginalised ageing and industrial workforce and population, where the inward movement of professionals of middle and upper class and establishment of new mixed service outlets geared towards those with higher levels of disposable income in areas with historically low-income earners. Such displacement occurred for the inner-city area of Millers Point, where the surrounding deindustrialisation and later revitalisation of Walsh Bay and The Hungry Mile/East Darling Harbour (known today as Barangaroo) led to a cultural shift whereby the area become highly sought after with an increase in land values.

Private sector interests 
The transition to a neoliberal governance structure since the 1980s has seen the state-led delivery urban renewal projects shift from public to private investment. This is facilitated by strong domestic and international investment in the highly-speculative property market. The move away from the government's previous stance on urban sprawl has led to a wave of mass urban consolidation as a reaction to the 'quarter acre block' being wasteful in terms of infrastructure provision and land scarcity. The urban renewal of areas to create high density communities has been driven by speculative developers which saw lending for investment properties rising 150% between 2013 and 2015. Consequently, there has been an increasing disparity between urban ambitions set out by government masterplans, and the actual delivery of the urban projects. These public ambitions have steered to reflect those of the private sector evident in renewal projects such as Barangaroo and cautioned for the Bays Precinct.

Neighbourhoods

Barangaroo 

On the western waterfront of Sydney's central business district is Barangaroo, a 22 hectare, mixed-use precinct consisting of commercial, residential and public spaces; split into three parts: Barangaroo Central, Barangaroo Reserve and Barangaroo South. The $6 billion redevelopment of the former shipping yard, is slated for completion by 2024 with a new metro station, several apartment complexes and a 275-metre tower slated to be Sydney's tallest building and home to Crown Sydney currently in construction. Barangaroo is Sydney's largest urban renewal project and aims to be the world's first carbon neutral precinct through responsible waste management, water recycling and solar energy use and generation. When the project was announced in 2005, the brief stated that at least 50% of the land would be parkland, with a foreshore walk. The winning design proposed 389,511 square metres of floor space with a waterfront park stretching the entire foreshore and the tallest building towering 92 metres. That design was dropped in favour Lend Lease, who won the rights the develop Barangaroo. There were eight revisions to Lend Lease's original plan with the final plan proposing 681,008 square metres of floor space, a separate headland park and a Crown Resorts in the tallest tower.

Forced removal of Millers Point residents 

Adjacent to Barangaroo lies the suburb of Millers Point, consisting of mostly public housing and was described by residents as a "village within the metropolis". In March 2014, the Minister for Family and Community Services, who was responsible for public housing in New South Wales, Pru Goward, announced that 293 public housing properties across Millers Point and the adjoining Dawes Point and The Rocks would be sold off. This included those who resided in the 12-storey Sirius apartment block in The Rocks. Consequently, all 579 tenants were required to relocate to alternative housing, with the revenue generated from the sale to build additional housing to help address the 57,000 housing deficit at the time. The displacement is a result of the gentrification of the area as the NSW Government saw an opportunity to sell state-owned assets with the increase in house prices in the area. Following the announcement of the sale, Friends of Millers Point was created; a coalition of supporters that opposed the forced relocation of residents.

Pyrmont-Ultimo 

Pyrmont and Ultimo sit adjacent to the Sydney central business district as a mixed-use entertainment, residential and commercial area, former to the industrial precinct that existed prior to the 1980s. From the mid-19th century, the area was home to primary industries and their storage, processing and export facilities. Pymont-Ultimo housed Sydney's first power station, with shipbuilding, steel, wool and flour industries that contributed to the local economy. Colonial Sugar Refinery opened its factories in 1878 and was the last to shut down its Pymont operations in 1992 as the area underwent renewal. During this period of revitalisation throughout the 1990s, local industry closed down and its residents and businesses relocated to the suburbs. According to the census, Pyrmont and Ultimo experienced a population decline from 4,007 residents in 1961, further dropping to 2,598 in 1971, and 1,590 by 1981. What was once a vibrant and bustling industrial hub, turned derelict by the mid-1970s, which was voted at the time as the worst place to live in Sydney, along with Zetland. In the early 1990s, under the federal government's Building Better Cities Program, much of the program's $278 million budget was allocated to revitalise the area to a high-density, post-modern development. More than 9,200 dwellings were built, including 16 apartment blocks that formed Jackson's Landing; a high-end development at the northern end of the peninsula. The population in the area had grown to 4,615 in 1996, 14,165 by 2001, and 21,656 according to the 2016 census. The renewal of Pyrmont and Ultimo metaphorically represented Sydney's transition from 'old economy' to 'new economy' and reflects Sydney's repositioning as a global city. In 2019, a proposal was made to rezone and redevelop Pyrmont and the surrounding Western Harbour Precinct as an area that can generate up to $20 billion in economic growth and 10,000 jobs. This proposal came during a time when Pyrmont was identified as a potential stop in the new Sydney Metro West network.

Future projects

Central Precinct 

The Central Precinct represents over 24 hectares of government-owned land that is proposed to be revitalised along the railway corridor between Central Station and Cleveland Street, Sydney. A mixed-use urban precinct consisting of offices, parks and shops with the potential of residential apartments is envisioned and planned to be built over existing railyards, attracting technology companies and start-ups. The precinct aims to create 25,000 jobs, foster innovation and increase educational opportunities. Tech giant Atlassian is set to anchor a 35-storey office tower as part of the precinct. In 2018, work started on the redevelopment of Central Station which include the construction of new underground metro platforms, a new underground concourse (Central Walk) and accessibility improvements. The renewal of the station is expected to complete in 2022.

The Bays Precinct 

The Bays Precinct will be one of Sydney's most significant urban renewal projects with almost 100 hectares of land to be redeveloped between White Bay Power Station, Blackwattle Bay and Rozelle railyards over the next 20 to 30 years. The Precinct is the largest urban transformation project since the 2000 Sydney Olympics with its 95-hectares of waterways and 5.5 kilometre waterfront. UrbanGrowth NSW released its transformation plan in 2015, outlining the strategic direction of the project. Masterplans for the precinct are being developed with community consultations anticipated in 2020. The Bays Precinct will be home to the new Sydney Fish Market (opening 2023), a new metro station as well as a mix of commercial, cultural and residential uses.

See also 
 Urban planning in Australia
 Urbanization in Australia

References 

Urban renewal
Gentrification
Urban planning in Australia
Sydney